Maxfield (foaled  February 17, 2017) is an American Thoroughbred racehorse who won the Breeders' Futurity Stakes at age two, the Matt Winn and Tenacious Stakes at age three, and the Mineshaft, Alysheba Stakes and Stephen Foster Stakes at age four.

Background
Maxfield was bred in Kentucky by Godolphin Stables and races for them as a homebred. He was sired by Street Sense, the winner of the 2007 Kentucky Derby. His dam, Velvety, is by Bernardini and is a half-sister to both Grade I winner Sky Mesa and multiple stakes winner Golden Velvet. The family descends from influential broodmare La Troienne through the branch created by Busanda.

He is trained by Brendan Walsh.

Racing career

Two-year-old season (2019)
Maxfield made his first start in a maiden special weight at Churchill Downs on September 14, 2019. He got a slow start and was still in tenth place after half a mile, some 8 lengths behind the early leaders. He swung six wide in the turn and began to improve his position as they turned into the stretch. Still in fifth place in mid-stretch, he gradually pulled clear to win by three-quarters of a length.

For his next start, Maxfield was stepped sharply up in class in the Grade I Breeders' Futurity Stakes at Keeneland on October 5. The favorites were Gouverneur Morris, Tap it to Win, and Ajaaweed, with Maxfield going off at 6-1. He again broke poorly and was well back in the early running. As they entered the stretch, he swept past Gouverneur Morris and drew off to win by  lengths. "He's a very nice horse, and he's very smart," said jockey José Ortiz. "He broke slow first time, took dirt, and came running at Churchill. Today, he did the same thing. Broke a bit slow, relaxed, and when I asked him to go, he was there for me the whole time. 

The victory made Maxfield one of the early favorites for the 2019 Breeders' Cup Juvenile, but he was withdrawn from the race after he started favoring his right foreleg following a workout.

Three-year-old season (2020)

Maxfield returned on May 23, 2020, with a third consecutive victory, this time in the Grade II Matt Winn Stakes. Despite the layoff, he went off as the 7-5 favorite in a field of ten that included multiple Derby hopefuls such as Ny Traffic and Pneumatic. Maxfield was bumped at the start and again trailed the field for much of the race. He split between horses on the turn to find racing room, then battled with Pneumatic and Ny Traffic down the stretch. In the final furlong, he drew clear to win by a length.

The wins qualified Maxfield for the 2020 Kentucky Derby (delayed to September due to the COVID-19 pandemic). However, he was withdrawn from consideration when he again went lame, this time due to a condylar fracture in his right fore. He was sent to Rood and Riddle Equine Hospital where Dr. Larry Bramlage inserted a couple of screws to stabilize the leg while it healed. 

Maxfield returned on December 19 in the listed Tenacious Stakes at the Fair Grounds, where he was the clear favorite. Breaking more alertly than in the past, he defeated Pat Day Mile runner up Sonneman by  lengths in his fourth consecutive win.

Four-year-old season (2021)

Maxfield began his four-year-old campaign on February 13, 2021 in the Mineshaft Stakes at the Fair Grounds, where he kept his undefeated record intact with an easy  length victory over Sonneman despite again breaking poorly. His winning streak came to an end though in the Grade I Santa Anita Handicap on March 6. He went off as the even money favorite in a field of eight and settled in fifth place in a tightly bunched field. In the final turn, he swung out four wide and began to make up ground. However, he could not match the closing speed of Idol, and finished third, beaten by two lengths closing very nicely.

Maxfield made his next start on April 30 in the Alysheba Stakes at Churchill Downs. Going off as the 1-2 favorite in a field of six, his main rival was expected to be Grade I winner Roadster. The two favorites stalked the early pace, then launched their moves as they turned for home. Roadster could not match the acceleration of Maxfield and eventually finished fourth. Maxfield drew away down the stretch to win by  lengths. "I was very confident all the way around," said Ortiz. "We were right where I wanted to be. When it came time to go, he was there for me. He's one of the nice ones." 

After an 8 week break, on June 26 Maxfield started as the 2/5 odds-on favorite and continued his winning ways by easily winning the Grade II Stephen Foster Stakes. After settling mid pack he cleared the field with a furlong to race and continuing to increase his margin of victory to  lengths in a time of 1:48.53. His victory assured him a start later in the year in the Breeders' Cup Classic.

In G1 Whitney Stakes at Saratoga on August 7, Maxfield found the front running Knicks Go too strong, after giving away an 8 length lead on the backstretch, finishing second by 4 lengths in a fast time of 1:47.70.
 
After anonther eight week break Maxfield was entered in the Grade I Woodward Stakes, which was moved to Belmont Park in 2021. Maxfield started as the 9-10 odds-on favorite, broke evenly and settled behind the leaders, but pinned in down on the rail. He then rallied with two furlongs to run and chased the winner Art Collector willingly. His trainer, Brendan Walsh was pleased with his effort. "He never lets us down!"

In his last start of his career in the Grade I Clark Stakes at Churchill Downs Maxfield was almost an equal favorite at 6/5 with Midnight Bourbon. With little speed in the field other than 3-year-old Midnight Bourbon, Maxfield, was positioned right behind the pacesetter. Favorite Midnight Bourbon set  fractions of :23.83 and :48 but Maxfield was close behind. Heading into the second turns, Maxfield was set to pounce. Midnight Bourbon showed resistance until the final furlong, when Maxfield took the lead and with 100 yards remaining Happy Saver loomed outside Maxfied, but jockey José Ortiz had hold of a determined Maxfield winning by a half-length in a time 1:49.06 for the  miles distance.

Racing statistics 

As asterisk after the odds means Maxfield was the post-time favorite

Stud career

Maxfield stands as a stallion for Darley at Jonabell Farm for a service fee of $40,000.

Pedigree

References

2017 racehorse births
Thoroughbred family 1-x
Racehorses bred in Kentucky
Racehorses trained in the United States